The Hasmonean royal winter palaces are a complex of Hasmonean and Herodian buildings from the Second Temple period, which were discovered in the western plain of Jericho valley, at Tulul Abu al-'Alayiq, near the place where the Roman road connecting Jericho with Jerusalem enters Wadi Qelt. Two tells are located on either side of Wadi Qelt.

The palaces are evidence of the luxurious lifestyle of the Hasmonean dynasty and of Herod the Great. They made extensive use of swimming pools, bathhouses, ornamental gardens and orchards. The palaces were not far from Jerusalem – 20 km along the ancient Roman road.

History of excavations 

The site was excavated in the 19th century by Charles Warren, who attempted to locate the place of Biblical Jericho. After making an archaeological trench, he concluded that this site is from the Roman period. Additional excavations were conducted by the Germans Ernst Sellin and Carl Watzinger, in 1910–1911, but the results have never been published. In 1950, two expeditions from the United States dug on the site. An ornamental garden with magnificent remains from the time of Herod was discovered north of the southern tell, and labeled "the sunken garden." Farther north were discovered the remains of a building, identified as a gymnasium.

After the Yom Kippur War in 1973, extensive excavations were conducted on site by archaeologist Ehud Netzer. The excavations continued for ten seasons and covered an area of 30 hectares. The excavations also revealed remains of aqueducts to the west of Jericho. At the oasis of Jericho, Netzer uncovered new wings of Herod's winter palace, as well as a Hasmonean (Maccabean) winter palace containing a number of swimming pools and gardens.  The complex includes the Jericho synagogue, built 7050 BC and identified as one of the oldest synagogues ever found.

Site description 

Survey and excavations show that the site covers an area of 120 hectares, and is only part of Second Temple-period Jericho. A series of winter palaces were discovered, some which were shown to have been built by the Hasmoneans, and others by Herod the Great, who inherited the older estate and substantially expanded the palatial compound with new buildings. It turned out that the area of the city of Jericho was very broad. South of one of the palaces, in the area that today is the Aqabat Jaber refugee camp, remains  of luxurious houses were discovered, scattered over dozens of acres. A royal farm was discovered north of the palaces, covering an area of 450 dunams. A close connection was found between the farm and the winter palaces.

Aqueducts, which were built during the Hasmonean period, enabled the construction of the winter palaces and the farm. Two aqueducts brought water to the site from the following springs that flow year-round:

 Wadi Qelt: Ein Perat, Ein Mabua, Ein Qelt.
 Nahal Na'aran: Ein Noema, Ein Diuk, Ein Shusha.

Hasmonean palace 

The Hasmonean winter palace, at the northern part of the site, consisted of the following structures:
 The main building
 Swimming pool complex
 Southern division ("twin palaces")

The Hasmonean palace was built on a hill overlooking the city of Jericho. The palace was built by John Hyrcanus I (134-104 BCE) and believed to have been fortified during the reign of Alexander Jannaeus (103-76 BCE).

A strong earthquake in 31 BCE destroyed the palace. Evidence to this was found in different parts of the complex. On its site King Herod built an artificial tell, or mound, on which he built his second palace. The establishment of the mound resulted in coverage of the Hasmonean palace, and thus parts of it were preserved, such as a building wall remaining 7 metres high.

The main structure of the Hasmonean palace was 50 by 50 metres. Elements of the building were as was customary for luxury palaces in the area:

 Rooms were decorated with colorful frescoes, imitating marble.
 Stucco decorations in the form of building stones.
 An unroofed central courtyard.
 The water flowed into the swimming pools and buildings through clay and lead pipes, buried in the ground, and aqueducts supplied water to gardens and orchards.

Remains were found of two pairs of swimming pools: a small pair west of the palace, and a large pair north of it. It is speculated that the pools were the focus of entertainment and enjoyment of the inhabitants of the palace. Perhaps they are also the place where, according to historian Josephus, Aristobulus III (53-36 BC), the last high priest from the Hasmonean dynasty, was drowned. South of the large pools was a luxurious 21 by 17 metres building, the so-called pavilion, built in the style of a Doric temple. An axis of symmetry passed through the pools, the open courtyard, and the temple north of them.

The "twin palaces" were two surprisingly similar buildings. The hypothesis is that they were built by Queen Shlomtzion (ruled 67–76 BCE) for her two sons, Hyrcanus and Aristobulus, in order to soften the rivalry between them that lasted nearly thirty years. The size of the palaces was 25 by 25 metres. Each of the two palaces contained a luxurious bathhouse.

Many ritual baths were found around the palace, required by their priestly owners, who had to be ritually purified before eating terumah. A ritual bath for vessels was also found, containing the remains of 800 bowls. The palace also served the last Hasmonean king, Antigonus Matityahu II (r. 40-37 BCE), as evidenced by a hoard of 20 coins.

Herod's first palace 
The first palace was situated on the southern bank of Wadi Qelt, on land leased from Cleopatra, Queen of Egypt, who received it as a gift from Mark Antony in 36 BCE. Meanwhile, in the north, the Hasmonean palace was still standing. The palace was a rectangular building, 86 by 46 meters. In the center was an open courtyard with perimeter columns and a central pool draining the rainwater. In the palace were a magnificent hall, a luxurious bathhouse, and a pair of deep pools, which were apparently ritual baths.

The palace was exposed in 1951 by Pritchard, who thought it was a gymnasium. After excavation of the palace, it was covered over with sand.

Herod's second palace 
The second palace was built in 31 BCE. Herod won the trust of Emperor Augustus and in return received the Jericho area he had previously lost to the by then defunct Queen Cleopatra. After the earthquake of 31 BCE Herod decided to build a second palace on the ruins of the Hasmonean palace. He combined the pools of the Hasmonean palace into one large pool, 32 by 18 meters. The second palace (north of Wadi Qelt), along with the first palace (south of Wadi Qelt), served Herod for residential and ceremonial purposes.

A unique feature of the second palace was its residential wing, which contained a designated recreation area. The villa was built on an artificial tell covering the Hasmonean palace: 35 by 43 meters tall, eight meters above the surroundings, providing a view of the estate's orchards and the surroundings. The second palace was full of gardens. In the pleasure wing were the big pool and a bathhouse, which has been well preserved.

Herod's third palace 

The third palace was the most magnificent of the palaces. It was established on both sides of Wadi Qelt. Ehud Netzer, the editor of excavations at the site, believe that palace residents could see water flowing in the riverbed for up to two months a year, letting the viewers feel like they were on the edge of an actual river. The builders, who apparently were from Italy, used construction methods that were common in their homeland such as:

 Opus reticulatum - small stones, 10 cm by 10 cm, placed in diagonal rows. In Jericho they were anointed with white or colored plaster.
 Opus Koodroas - rectangular stones.

Local mud bricks were also layered on top of stone construction. After being covered with plaster, there was no difference between them and the models from Italy.

The third palace of Herod, in the center of the site, included the following buildings:

 The north wing.
 Sunken garden.
 The southern mound.
 Big pool.

Industrial area 
The industrial area was next to residential buildings and service buildings.

Royal estate 
In the estate a huge wine-press was found, which was probably used for making wine and "date honey". Farm crops, according to literary sources, were: palm trees, persimmon resin, and sap, which produced perfumes and medicines. Some of them were sent overseas. It was an intelligent use of the warm climate of the place.

See also 
Archaeology of Israel

References

External links

The Hasmonean Winter Palaces

Further reading 
 Ehud Netzer, "The winter palaces and royal estate in Jericho", (in) "Jericho and its environs", ax – bi monthly magazine for knowledge of the country, published by Ariel – Jerusalem, 1983

Ancient Jericho
Buildings and structures in Jericho
Archaeological sites in the West Bank
Biblical archaeology
Establishments in the Hasmonean Kingdom